Sir Andrew William Dilnot,  (born 19 June 1960) is a Welsh economist and broadcaster. He was formerly the Director of the Institute for Fiscal Studies from 1991 to 2002, and was Principal of St Hugh's College, Oxford between 2002 and 2012. As of September 2012 he is Warden of Nuffield College, Oxford. He served as Chair of the UK Statistics Authority from April 2012 until March 2017.

Early life and education
Dilnot attended Olchfa School, Swansea, a state comprehensive school.He studied Philosophy, Politics, and Economics at St John's College, Oxford.

Career
Dilnot was Director of the Institute for Fiscal Studies from 1991 to 2002.

Dilnot was a presenter on BBC Radio 4's programme about statistics More or Less. Many of the items on the programme deal with the misuse and fabrication of statistics. Dilnot and Michael Blastland wrote The Tiger That Isn't, which was based on More or Less.

Dilnot became Principal of St Hugh's College in 2002, then the only Head of House at an Oxford college educated at a comprehensive school. He became a Pro Vice-Chancellor of Oxford University in 2005.

On 16 March 2011, it was announced that "with very mixed emotions" Dilnot was to leave St Hugh's College in September 2012 to become Warden of Nuffield College, Oxford, "which will allow me to spend much more time doing economics again."

In 2011, the government nominated Dilnot to be Chair of the UK Statistics Authority. Parliament formally endorsed the appointment on 13 December 2011. Andrew Dilnot is no longer chair of the authority, having stood down in 2017.

In 2019, Dilnot became chair of the Health Foundation's oversight board for the REAL Centre (formerly Health and Social Care Sustainability Research Centre), which was set up to help health and social care policymakers consider long-term implications of their funding, design and delivery decisions.

Commission on Funding of Care and Support
In June 2010, Dilnot was asked by the government to chair the Commission on Funding of Care and Support. He took a sabbatical from St Hugh's College from March to July 2011.

The commission published its report in July 2011. The commission's primary recommendation was to limit individuals' contribution to social care costs to £35,000, after which the state would pay. Currently, individuals who do not fit means-tested criteria can be liable for unlimited costs.

The commission's report was welcomed by Health Secretary Andrew Lansley, and both David Cameron and Ed Miliband called for cross-party talks on the issue.

Honours
Dilnot was appointed Commander of the Order of the British Empire (CBE) in 2000 and knighted in the 2013 Birthday Honours for services to Economics and Economic Policy.

He is an Honorary Fellow of St John's College, Oxford, Queen Mary, University of London, the Swansea Institute of Higher Education and the Institute of Actuaries, and holds an Honorary Doctorate from City University and the Open University.

References

External links
University of Sheffield Knoop Lecture 2014 (video)

1960 births
Living people
British economists
Principals of St Hugh's College, Oxford
Fellows of St John's College, Oxford
Pro-Vice-Chancellors of the University of Oxford
British radio personalities
British television presenters
Commanders of the Order of the British Empire
Knights Bachelor
Academics of University College London
Academics of the London School of Economics
People associated with Queen Mary University of London
Channel 4 people
People educated at Olchfa School
People educated at Maidstone Grammar School
Wardens of Nuffield College, Oxford